Schloss Rabenstein is a castle in Styria, Austria. Schloss Rabenstein is situated at an elevation of 374 meters.

See also
List of castles in Austria

References

This article was initially translated from the German Wikipedia.

Castles in Styria